1949 saw the second full tour of South Africa by a representative New Zealand rugby union team (the New Zealand national rugby union team). The All Blacks achieved a record of 13 wins, 7 losses and 4 draws, and they lost the test series 4–0.

Non-selection of Māori players

As they had in 1928 and would do again in 1960, the New Zealand union left Māori players out of the 30-man tour squad to meet apartheid conditions set by South Africa. Particularly notable omissions were "Johnny Smith, Ben Couch and Vincent Bevan... All three (and Ron Bryers) would surely have otherwise gone to South Africa." Smith's official All Black profile now acknowledges "the unforgivable weakness shown by New Zealand rugby".

Kiwi Blake (who was of African American heritage but played for the Māori All Blacks) is quoted as saying that after a trial match he, Bevan and Smith were told by a selector that "If you had been eligible, you would have all gone". Researcher and historian Malcolm Mulholland wrote the All Blacks captain Fred Allen "later mourned the loss of Smith and, in particular, Bevan...as one of the main reasons for the All Blacks' four-nil series drubbing".

In 2010 the rugby unions of New Zealand and South Africa, and the South African government, apologised for this selection policy which was implemented at the South Africans' request by the NZRFU, which at the time had said that it "did not want to subject them [i.e. Māori] to possible reprisals".

As this tour took place, a simultaneous Australia tour to New Zealand led to the unusual situation of two All Black tests on 3 September 1949, in Durban and Wellington. The All Blacks lost both. One reason for New Zealand affording the Australian series test status was to allow Māori players excluded from South Africa to earn caps.

Matches
Scores and results list New Zealand's points tally first.

References

External links
 1949 Tour in Details

All Black tour
New Zealand national rugby union team tours of South Africa
Rugby union tour
All Black tour
Rugby union tours of Zimbabwe